Cirencester Park is a cricket ground in Cirencester, Gloucestershire.  The first recorded match on the ground was in 1853, when Cirencester played an All-England Eleven.

In 1879, Gloucestershire played a single first-class match at the ground against Surrey, which ended in a draw.

In local domestic cricket, the ground is the home venue of Cirencester Cricket Club.

References

External links
Cirencester Park on CricketArchive
Cirencester Park on Cricinfo

Cricket grounds in Gloucestershire
Sports venues completed in 1853